Menelaus (Ancient Greek: Μενέλαος, romanized: Menelaos) was the half-brother of Philip II, king of ancient Macedonia. He was the son of Amyntas III and Gygaea, Amyntas' second wife, and had two brothers, Archelaus and Arrhidaeus. Fearing rival claimants to the throne, Philip executed Archelaus in 359 BC, and later killed Menelaus and Arrhidaeus following a siege at Olynthus in 348 BC.

References

See also 
List of ancient Macedonians

4th-century BC Macedonians
People who died under the reign of Philip II of Macedon
Murdered royalty of Macedonia (ancient kingdom)
348 BC deaths
Year of birth unknown